Club Social y Deportivo Villa Española, usually known as Villa Española, is a football and boxing club located in Montevideo, Uruguay. It is best known for its football department, which is currently playing in the Uruguayan Primera División, and has its home games at Estadio Obdulio Varela.

History 
The club was founded on 18 August 1940 as a boxing club, and as a football club in 1950. The club's most important title was winning the Uruguayan Segunda División in 2001. As a result, it was promoted to the Primera División, where it stayed until relegation in 2003. Villa Española couldn't play the 2005 and 2006 Segunda División tournaments because of economic problems. They returned for the 2007–08 season and achieved promotion, but were relegated to the Segunda División Amateur (3rd division) because of economic problems after the 2008–09 season.

In 2013 the club was able to pay its debts and achieved promotion to the Segunda División. In 2016 it gained promotion to the Primera División, but was immediately relegated that same season.

Titles
Segunda División: 1
2001

Segunda División Amateur: 5
1973, 1980, 1987, 1996, 2014

Current squad

References

External links

Official Page (Spanish)

Football clubs in Uruguay
Association football clubs established in 1940
Sport in Montevideo
1940 establishments in Uruguay